Rogoźnica may refer to the following places in Poland:
Rogoźnica, Lower Silesian Voivodeship (south-west Poland)
Rogoźnica, Lublin Voivodeship (east Poland)
Rogoźnica, Subcarpathian Voivodeship (south-east Poland)
Rogoźnica, West Pomeranian Voivodeship (north-west Poland)